Gashun (also Romanized as Gashūn) is a village in Godeh Rural District, in the Central District of Bastak County, Hormozgan Province, Iran. At the 2006 census, its population was 76, in 15 families.

References 

Populated places in Bastak County